Parker v Small Smith (2005) 5 NZCPR 921 is a cited case in New Zealand regarding whether a nominee stated in a contract is sufficiently designated in order for the Contracts (Privity) Act 1982 to apply.

References

High Court of New Zealand cases
New Zealand contract case law
2005 in New Zealand law
2005 in case law